"Booker T" is a song by Puerto Rican rapper and singer Bad Bunny. It was released on January 2, 2021 by Rimas Entertainment, as the third single from his third solo studio album El Último Tour Del Mundo. It won Best Rap/Hip Hop Song at the 22nd Annual Latin Grammy Awards.

Composition

According to Esquire, "Booker T" is a song about "personal vindication", with Bad Bunny discussing his commercial success, criticism, award shows, and other artists' promotional trends. Remezcla also interprets that, in the song, the rapper feels proud of his achievements "without having to promote his songs".

Music video
The music video was directed by Stillz and released on January 2, 2021. It shows Bad Bunny and WWE wrestler Booker T inside a trailer, referencing the album cover. Bad Bunny appears wearing a t-shirt that reads "2032", year from a dystopian future he imagined where takes place the tour that inspired his compositions during confinement. The wrestler starts the video standing unamused by the rapper, later following his rhythm as he performs the song. It has more than 237 million views on YouTube.

Live performances
The song had its first performance during the WWE's Royal Rumble in January 2021. Wrestler Booker T also appeared on that performance, imitating the music video.

Charts

Weekly charts

Year-end charts

Certifications

References

External links
 

2021 songs
2021 singles
Bad Bunny songs
Songs written by Bad Bunny
Spanish-language songs